Pisurgia or Pisourgia was a town on the coast of ancient Cilicia, between Celenderis and Seleucia ad Calycadnum, 45 stadia to the west of Cape Crauni (modern Silisalma Burnu or Ada Burnu), and to the right of the island of Crambusa.

Its site is located near Sipahili (Babadil) in Asiatic Turkey.

References

Populated places in ancient Cilicia
Former populated places in Turkey
History of Mersin Province